
Gmina Gruta is a rural gmina (administrative district) in Grudziądz County, Kuyavian-Pomeranian Voivodeship, in north-central Poland.

Villages
Gmina Gruta contains the villages and settlements of Annowo, Boguszewo, Dąbrówka Królewska, Gołębiewko, Gruta, Jasiewo, Kitnowo, Mełno, Mełno-Cukrownia, Nicwałd, Okonin, Orle, Plemięta, Pokrzywno, Salno, Słup and Wiktorowo.

Neighbouring gminas
Gmina Gruta is bordered by the gminas of Grudziądz, Łasin, Radzyń Chełmiński, Rogóźno and Świecie nad Osą.

References
Polish official population figures 2006

Gruta
Grudziądz County